The Pollyanna Principles is a book by author Hildy Gottlieb, centered on community benefit organizations and the processes that make them genuinely beneficial to the community. Gottlieb's focus is on the transformation of static, inert or otherwise stagnant practices and systems used by Community Benefit Organizations, consultants of those organizations and funding organizations.

Synopsis 

Gottlieb discusses in the book the effects of time and expectation in regards to the community benefit sector, and how past events have encouraged a 'Culture of Can't' amongst community benefits organizations. This concept is typified by a "litany of seemingly reasonable reasons why something cannot be done", and therefore thwarts efforts to make changes within communities.

One of the principal issues discussed in the "Pollyanna Principles" is notion of board accountability on the means versus the ends (discussed below). Gottlieb the responsibilities of the board of a community benefit organization into two groups: the means and the ends. The means is defined, by Gottlieb, as that which is inherent to the day-to-day operation of the organization. For example, securing funding, office purchases, and managing employees and volunteers are all responsibilities that fall under the category of "means". It is also, according to Gottlieb, what most organizations spend the majority of their time and resources finding solutions for. Where more energy ought to be focused, says Gottlieb, are the ends. The "ends" in this case is the mission of the organization and the vision for the community they serve.

The book also contains methods which Gottlieb refers to as the titular Pollyanna Principles, divided into two sections: The Ends and The Means. These principles define what should be concentrated on for the duration of all processes in regards to community benefit.

The Ends 

1. We accomplish what we hold ourselves accountable for.

The book describes this first principle as such: "There are four basic functions of a board that relate to its ultimate accountability: leadership (the "ends"), legal oversight, operational oversight, and board mechanics (the "means"). Boards generally regard their accountability in a way completely asymmetrical in emphasis on the "means". A by-product of a "means" emphasis on "keeping the organization out of trouble" (legal and operational oversight) is a fear-based risk management system as a result, the actual vision of the organization remains unfulfilled."

2. Each and every one of us is creating the future, every day, whether we do so consciously or not.

Gottlieb offers this explanation for the second principle: "Community benefit organizations aim to solve problems; however, the 'problems' that many organizations attempt to fix are often symptoms of a larger problem that have been misdiagnosed as individual maladies. The vast majority of contemporary efforts to create better communities myopically focus on the "problems of today" and ignore the future that is shaped with every decision. Focusing on the future allows for a greater context by which to measure "success"; it allows an organization to focus on the contemporary situation and what lies beyond it."

The Means 

3.  Everyone and everything is interconnected and interdependent, whether we acknowledge that or not.

According to the book, the third principle can be explained in this way: "The assumptions the sector currently holds about interdependence are actually quite the opposite: competition and independence are the keys to success.  Most grant processes, even the ones designed to encourage "collaboration" within the sector, are competitive by nature and resource centers ground their educational approaches in the "dog-eat-dog" mentality. If this competitive mindset were working, we would see amazing communities and amazing results from organizational efforts to improve them, but we do not."

4. Being the change we want to see means walking the talk of our values.

On the fourth principle, the books provides this account: "The inclination to rationalize often allows an organization to unwittingly stray from its mission or even behave completely opposite from their ideology. 'Walking the talk' is at the root of the word 'integrity', however few organizations implement systems to ensure their values are upheld.  'Walking the talk' requires that systems are in place so that decisions that may lead to rationalization are solved before they even arise, even while survival-driven concerns can complicate even the simplest choices."

5. Strength builds upon our strengths, not our weaknesses.

Gottlieb illustrates the fifth principle accordingly: "Community strength is built on the strength of the organizations that serve it, however  most of the work being done by community benefit organizations is being done with an attitude of scarcity and weakness. This scarcity assumption yields a focus on what will bring in money and what aspects of the organization are in a crisis state. When the scarcity assumption is replaced with an assumption of strength, the whole world changes: 'can't' becomes 'possibility'."

6. Individuals will go where systems lead them.

The book constructs the sixth principle along these lines: "None of the standard systems used by this sector  planning, governance, development etc. - are  aimed at potential. These systems primarily focus on reactive or incremental change vs. creating a proactive, extraordinary future for our communities. Individuals and groups will go where the systems point them. What is needed are systems that set high expectations and inspire decisions that aim towards those expectations."

Governance 

The book then introduces the concepts of Governing for What Matters and Community Impact Planning. Governing for What Matters entails "leading, guiding, and making decisions on behalf of the Community," according to Gottlieb. While Community Impact Planning describes a means for organizations to institute true, positive change that has long-standing effects on communities, rather than having organizations react "incrementally to community circumstances and needs".

Gottlieb's principal contention regarding governance argues that governance, at its core, is simply the act of making decisions for and leadership of other individuals. Governance for community benefit boards, says Gottlieb, is generally broken down into what they hold themselves accountable for. Generally, most boards find that their accountability lies with what Gottlieb describes as the "means" - legal oversight, operational oversight and board mechanics (day-to-day operation of the board itself). What a board ought to governing for, argues Gottlieb, is creating a positive future for the communities they serve. The book asserts that in order to do this, the board must examine the impact to the community in every decision that they make.

This examination provides the framework for Community Impact Planning, also discussed within the Pollyanna Principles. This strategy, coupled with Gottlieb's philosophy about governance purports to "reinvent nonprofit organizations", as stated in the sub-title of the book. It is in these and the following chapters that Gottlieb offers examples and descriptions for how to put the principles into practice.

Practical examples and application 

In the final section of the book, Gottlieb details methods in developing and sustaining community benefit organization programs utilizing the aforementioned principles by using examples of organizations that have put the philosophies behind the principles into practice. The first example Gottlieb offers is the Southern Arizona Diaper Bank, the formation of which catalyzed the development of the core philosophies contained within the book itself. Another example found within the book describes the efforts of Saint Luke's Health Initiatives of Phoenix Arizona in creating a funding project for organizations within their community. Utilizing Gottlieb's strategies of crafting decisions around community impact, systemic aim and interconnected effort, SLHI created comprehensive programs that were effective in improving the future of the community they served.

See also 
Community Engagement
Pollyanna principle
Friendraising

References 

2009 non-fiction books
American non-fiction books